Colman Jason Makouké (born 7 June 1990) is a Guadeloupean professional footballer who plays as a centre-back for the club Juventus Sainte-Anne, and the Guadeloupe national team.

International career
Makouké debuted with the Guadeloupe national team in a 2–0 friendly loss to Martinique on 26 December 2015. He was called up to represent Guadeloupe at the 2021 CONCACAF Gold Cup.

References

External links
 
 

1990 births
Living people
Sportspeople from Colombes
Guadeloupean footballers
Guadeloupe international footballers
French footballers
French people of Guadeloupean descent
Association football defenders
2021 CONCACAF Gold Cup players
Footballers from Hauts-de-Seine